Saint John of the Mountain is:

Geography 
 Saint John Mountain (California)- a mountain in California, USA
 Saint John of the Mountain (Spain) - a village in the province of Burgos, Spain
 Saint John of the Mountain (Philippines) - a village in Quezon, Philippines

Culture 
 Saint John of the Mountain Festival - a festival in Miranda de Ebro, Spain